Agnieszka Radwańska was the defending champion but decided not to participate.

Kaia Kanepi won the title, defeating Peng Shuai in the final, 6–2, 7–5.

Seeds
The top two seeds receive a bye into the second round.

Draw

Finals

Top half

Bottom half

Qualifying

Seeds

Qualifiers

Lucky losers
  Coco Vandeweghe

Qualifying draw

First qualifier

Second qualifier

Third qualifier

Fourth qualifier

References
Main Draw
Qualifying Draw

Brussels Open - Singles
2013 Singles